The Laboratory of study of microstructures, mechanics and material sciences (in French : Laboratoire d'étude des microstructures et de mécanique des matériaux), also known as the LEM3, is a French laboratory of research located in Metz. It is under the authority of Arts et Métiers ParisTech, University of Lorraine and ENIM. It is part of the Carnot Institute ARTS and currently employs more than 150 persons. It was created in 2011 from the merge of 2 CNRS laboratories, the LPMM and the LETAM.
The LEM3 plays an important role in the competitiveness organization "Materialia" and in the new research institute M2P.

Teaching and research topics 

The main part of the research is focused on the following lines :

Multi-scale material characterization
Material behavior of high-yield steels
Study of smart materials : composite material, SMA, piezoelectric material

Research teams 

The laboratory is divided in seven research teams, which have their own field of research :

 TMP : Texture, microstructure and process
 MeNu : computational mechanics
 APLI : Auto-organization, plasticity and intern lengths
 3TAM : transformation, textures, topology and metal anisotropy
 SMART : Multi-phased systems, rheology, fatigue and applications
 SIP : surface, interface and process
 CeDyn : extreme conditions and dynamics

Projects 

The LEM3 is behind the creation of the Labex DAMAS (laboratory of excellence for alloyed metals) which get a financial support of 7.5 million euros over 8 years.

Facilities and equipment 

In 2013, a microscope with the electron backscatter detector technology was funded by the Lorraine Region (one million euros).
The laboratory also has a high-strength multi-axial tensile test machine with a capacity of  72 tons per axis.

Locations 

 CIRAM, center of research in Metz Science Park
 Metz campus of Arts et Métiers ParisTech

References and notes 

Laboratories of Arts et Métiers ParisTech
Laboratories in France
French National Centre for Scientific Research